Laura Wright (born 1970) is an American actress.

Laura Wright may also refer to:

 Laura Wright (literary scholar), vegan studies theorist
 Laura Wright (author), American author of romance novels
 Laura Wright (cricketer), Australian cricketer
 Laura Wright (singer) (born 1990), English soprano
 Laura Beltz Wright, member of the Alaska Territorial Guard during World War II
 Laura Maria Sheldon Wright, American missionary
 Laura Wright, CFO of Southwest Airlines
 Laura Wright, character from  comic book Femforce, secret identity of Nightveil 
 Laura Wright (Brookside), a character from British soap Brookside played by Jane Cunliffe